Hibiscus diriffan is a species of flowering plant in the family Malvaceae. It is found only in Yemen. Its natural habitat is rocky areas.

References

diriffan
Endemic flora of Socotra
Least concern plants
Taxonomy articles created by Polbot